The 2021–22 King Cup, or The Custodian of the Two Holy Mosques Cup, was the 47th edition of the King Cup since its establishment in 1957. The tournament began on 19 December 2021 and concluded with the final on 19 May 2022. 

The number of teams remained 16 due to the congested fixture schedule which will see the Saudi national team participate in the 2022 FIFA World Cup qualifiers and the 2021 FIFA Arab Cup. The competition was limited to the 16 teams participating in the 2021–22 Saudi Professional League.

Al-Faisaly are the defending champions after winning their first title last season. They were eliminated by Al-Ahli in the round of 16.

Al-Fayha won their first King Cup title by beating Al-Hilal on penalties in the final following a 1–1 draw after extra time. In doing so, they became the 10th different team to win the King Cup. As winners of the competition, Al-Fayha qualified for the 2023–24 AFC Champions League qualifying play-offs.

Participating teams
A total of 16 teams participated in this season. All of which compete in the Pro League.

Bracket

Note:     H: Home team, A: Away team

Source: SAFF

Round of 16
The draw for the whole tournament was held on 8 November 2021. The dates for the Round of 16 fixtures were announced on 22 November 2021. All times are local, AST (UTC+3).

Quarter-finals
The dates for the Quarter-final fixtures were announced on 11 January 2022. All times are local, AST (UTC+3).

Semi-finals
The dates for the Semi-final fixtures were announced on 6 March 2022. All times are local, AST (UTC+3).

Final

All times are local, AST (UTC+3).

Top goalscorers
As of 19 May 2022

References

External links
Custodian of the Two Holy Mosques Cup – Saudi Arabia 2022, Goalzz.com
King's Cup, saff.com.sa

2021–22
2021–22 in Saudi Arabian football
Saudi Arabia